Kelso may refer to:

Places

Australia
 Kelso, New South Wales
 Kelso, Tasmania
 Kelso, Queensland

Canada
 Kelso Conservation Area, Ontario, containing Lake Kelso
 Kelso, a village in Regional Municipality of Halton, Ontario

New Zealand
Kelso, New Zealand

South Africa
 Kelso, KwaZulu-Natal, a small coastal village south of Durban

United Kingdom
Kelso, Scottish Borders, Scotland
Kelso railway station

United States
Kelso, Arkansas
Kelso, California
Kelso Dunes
Kelso Mountains
Claraville, California formerly Kelso
Kelso Township, Dearborn County, Indiana
Kelso Township, Sibley County, Minnesota
Kelso, Missouri
Kelso Township, Scott County, Missouri
Kelso Site in Hooker County, Nebraska, the site of a prehistoric village
Kelso, Oregon
Kelso, Tennessee
Kelso, Texas
Kelso, Washington

Sports
Kelso Racecourse, a horse racing venue in Kelso, Scotland
Kelso (horse), an American thoroughbred racehorse 
Kelso RFC, a rugby club in Kelso, Scotland
Kelso Stakes, an American horse race in Elmont, New York
Kelso United F.C., a football club in Kelso, Scotland
Premier Kelso Hurdle, a national hunt hurdle race in Scotland

Other uses
 Kelso (name), a surname and a given name, including a list of people with the name
 MV Kelso, a fishing vessel, later named MY Titanic
 Kelso & Company, an American private equity firm 
 Kelso River, a stream in Minnesota, U.S.
 Michael Kelso, a fictional character in That '70s Show

See also

 Kelsey (disambiguation)
 Kelso High School (disambiguation)